Buckley's forest falcon (Micrastur buckleyi), also called lesser collared forest-falcon and Traylor's forest-falcon, is a species of bird of prey in subfamily Herpetotherinae of family Falconidae, the falcons and caracaras. It is found in Brazil, Eucador, Peru, and possibly Colombia and Venezuela.

Taxonomy and systematics

Buckley's forest falcon was previously considered to be a variant of the collared forest falcon (M. semitoquatus). The two of them and the slaty-backed forest falcon (M. mirandollei) are sister species. It is monotypic.

Description

Adult males have black upperparts with a white collar. Their cheeks, throat, and underparts are white and unmarked. Their tail is black with three narrow white bars on the inner feathers and four on the outer ones. Their iris is dark brown, their cere, lores, and bare skin around the eye are dull greenish, and their legs and feet are yellowish. Adult females are like males with the addition of white spots on their scapulars and secondaries. Juveniles are also black above but have a buffy breast and dark bars on the belly.

Distribution and habitat

Buckley's forest falcon is known from only a few specimens, photographs, and sightings. Specimens confirm its presence in extreme western Brazil, eastern Ecuador, and eastern Peru. A few sight records in Colombia and Venezuela lead the South American Classification Committee of the American Ornithological Society to classify it as hypothetical in those two countries.

Behavior

Movement

Buckley's forest falcon is assumed to be a year-round resident.

Feeding

Almost nothing is known about the diet or hunting technique of Buckley's forest falcon. One specimen had a small Mesomys arboreal rat in its stomach. The species' small feet suggest that birds are only a minor part of its diet.

Breeding

Sightings of Buckley's forest falcon fledglings suggest that its breeding season includes April to early August. Nothing else is known about its breeding biology though it is assumed to nest in tree cavities like other Micrastur forest falcons.

Vocalization

The most common Buckley's forest falcon vocalization is "a far-carrying, nasal "eeok, oow"  or "eeok, oow...ow", repeated...for long periods, mainly at dawn." It also occasionally makes "a long rising series of "kaw" notes followed by 2-3 falling "aauw" notes".

Status

The IUCN has assessed Buckley's forest falcon as being of Least Concern, though it has a limited range and an unknown population size that is believed to be decreasing. No immediate threats have been identified. It is poorly known and considered to be rare. "Evidence suggest that species is not immediately threatened; however, at least in part of range, habitat is in process of being cleared."

References

Buckley's forest falcon
Birds of the Ecuadorian Amazon
Birds of the Peruvian Amazon
Buckley's forest falcon
Buckley's forest falcon
Taxonomy articles created by Polbot